Ang is a letter of related and vertically oriented alphabets used to write Mongolic and Tungusic languages.

Mongolian language 

 Transcribes Chakhar ; Khalkha . Transliterated into Cyrillic with the letters .
 Derived from Old Uyghur nun-kaph ( and ) digraph.
 Produced with  using the Windows Mongolian keyboard layout.
 In the Mongolian Unicode block,  comes after  and before .

Notes

References 

Articles containing Mongolian script text
Mongolic letters
Mongolic languages
Tungusic languages